Julian Hinojosa (born September 20, 2001) is an American professional soccer player who plays as a defender for North Carolina Tar Heels.

References

External links
 
 Julian Hinojosa at FC Dallas

2001 births
Living people
American soccer players
Association football defenders
North Carolina Tar Heels men's soccer players
North Texas SC players
Soccer players from Texas
USL League One players